The following article presents a summary of the 2004-05 football season in Venezuela.

Torneo Apertura ("Opening" Tournament)

Torneo Clausura ("Closing" Tournament)

Aggregate Table

Venezuela national team 

 KEY:
 F = Friendly match
 CA04 = Copa América 2004 match
 WCQ06 = World Cup Qualification 2006 match - South America

References

External links 
 Venezuelan Football Federation 
 RSSSF
 AHEFV

 
Seasons in Venezuelan football